Christopher or Chris Larkin may refer to:
Christopher Larkin (actor) (born 1987), American actor
Christopher Larkin (conductor), American conductor
Christopher Larkin (composer), composer for video games, film, and television
Chris Larkin (born 1967), English actor
Chris Larkin, former keyboardist for new wave band The Vels